Commissariato di notturna  is a 1974 Italian crime-comedy film directed by .  It was one of the few films that tried to mix the classical commedia all'italiana with the poliziottesco genre.

Cast 
Rosanna Schiaffino: Sonia 
Gastone Moschin: Commissario Emiliano Borghini 
George Ardisson: Amedeo Furlan aka il Laureando 
Antonio Casagrande: Gennarino 
Emma Danieli: Lucia Bencivenga 
Giacomo Furia: brigadiere Santini 
Gisela Hahn: donna tedesca 
Leopoldo Trieste: Brigadiere Spanò 
Liana Trouche: Luisa, moglie di Borghini
Mario Valdemarin: Ferrari 
Maurice Ronet: Vittorio Cazzaniga 
Luciano Salce: On. Luigi Colacioppi 
Carlo Giuffrè: Antonio Carnevale aka Teodoro 
Annie Cordy: Pupa 
Aldo Bufi Landi: Appuntato  
Jean Lefebvre: Dindino 
Michele Gammino: Brigadiere Frascà 
Piero Gerlini: Monsignor Guidardini 
Roger Coggio: Cristoforo 
Ada Pometti: Anna Maria, Gennarino's daughter
Nerina Montagnani: Old woman in black

References

External links

1974 films
Italian crime comedy films
Poliziotteschi films
1970s crime comedy films
Films directed by Guido Leoni
1974 comedy films
1970s Italian-language films
1970s Italian films